Andrés Botero Phillipsbourne (born December 23, 1945) is a Colombian mechanical engineer, businessman and sports leader.

He inherited the passion for sports activities from his father, Oscar Botero, born in Paris, France, who married the British  Muriel Catherine Philipsbourne and years later moved to Colombia, where Andrés was born. From the early age of 6 years, Botero began practicing sports activities, more specifically, shotgun shooting and horseback riding. Throughout his life, Botero has always had a passion for sports and other physically demanding activities, having practiced hunting, horse riding, aviation, rallying, motorboating and motorcycling, among others.

As an athlete, he became national champion in water skiing for 10 consecutive years, South American champion in slalom and jumping, and World Power Boat champion in river racing.

On January 21, 2012, he was appointed director of Coldeportes by President Juan Manuel Santos, replacing Jairo Clopatofsky.

In March 2017, Botero was appointed president of Atlético Nacional Football Club, one of the most prestigious professional football clubs in Colombia, based in the city of Medellín.

Professional positions

Specifically in the sports area he has been:

 President of the Waterski Club of Medellín.
 Representative of the athletes before the World Technical Committee (1970 - 1971).
 President of the Colombian Federation of Waterski (1972 - 1974)
 Organizer of the World Waterski Championship (Bogotá, Colombia, 1973).
 President of the Pan American Ski Confederation, (Berkeley, 1980).
 Promoter of Water skiing in Latin America. Promoter of the Latin American championships, which led South America to have a junior world champion (Javier Julio, in Argentina - 1994).
 President of the International Water Ski Federation, (Villach, Austria 1991).
 President of ARISF (Association of Sports Recognized by the IOC (1993 - 1994).
 He achieved recognition for water skiing at the Pan American Games (Mar del Plata, Argentina, 1995).
 Member of the Colombian Olympic Committee, 1995.
 Promoter of the Professional World Cup, 1996.
 Pioneer of Ultralight aviation in Colombia; organizer of the National Air Meeting (Santa Fe de Antioquia, 1988); creator of the Magdalena River Race.
 President of the Colombian Olympic Committee for twelve years.
 President of Atlético Nacional Football Club. (2017 - 2018)

External links
 Andrés Botero, un hombre del deporte a Coldeportes (2012)

References

1945 births
Living people
Sportspeople from Medellín
20th-century Colombian people
Colombian mechanical engineers